Elections were held in Metro Manila (the National Capital Region) for seats in the House of Representatives of the Philippines on May 13, 2019.

The candidate with the most votes won that district's seat for the 18th Congress of the Philippines.

Summary

Caloocan

1st District
Incumbent representative Dale Gonzalo Malapitan is running for reelection unopposed.

2nd District
Incumbent Edgar Erice is running for reelection.

Las Piñas
The seat is currently vacant after incumbent Mark Villar was appointed as DPWH Secretary. Legislative caretaker, incumbent DIWA Partylist Representative Emmelie Aglipay-Villar is barred for seeking a seat due to term limits. The candidates running for the position are Jerry delos Reyes and former TV host and businesswoman Camille Villar.

Makati

1st District
Incumbent Monsour del Rosario is running for Vice Mayor. The candidates running for the position are former Vice President Jejomar Binay, Brigido Mesina, Jr., former Mayor Romulo "Kid" Peña Jr. and Ferdinand Silva.

2nd District

Malabon
Incumbent Federico "Ricky" Sandoval is running for reelection. His opponent is former Representative Josephine "Jaye" Lacson-Noel.

Mandaluyong
Incumbent Queenie Gonzales is running for reelection, but later withdrew. Her husband, former Representative Neptali Gonzales II replaced her.

Manila

1st District
Manuel Luis "Manny" Lopez is the incumbent, and he will face former congressman Benjamin "Atong" Asilo.

2nd District
Carlo Lopez is the incumbent, and is term-limited. His cousin Alex is running under the Nacionalista Party, with support from PMP and KABAKA; Carlo is a member of PDP–Laban. Also running are incumbent councilors Rolan Valeriano (Asenso Manileño) and Rodolfo "Ninong" Lacsamana (NUP). The coalition of PDP–Laban and KKK did not nominate any candidate in this district.

3rd District
John Marvin "Yul Servo" Nieto is the incumbent, and is running under the PDP-Laban banner with support from Asenso Manileño. He will face former representative Zenaida "Naida" Angping, who is running under Lakas–CMD and supported by PMP and KABAKA.

4th District
Edward Maceda is the incumbent and will run against ex-Rep. Maria Theresa "Trisha" Bonoan-David (NUP, supported by Asenso Manileño) and independent candidate barangay kagawad Christopher "Chris" Gabriel.

5th District
Amanda Christina "Cristal" Bagatsing is the incumbent, and will face former councilor Arnold "Ali" Atienza.

6th District
Rosenda Ann "Sandy" Ocampo is the incumbent but she is now term-limited. She has endorsed her younger sister Patricia Yvette Ocampo, to run for her seat in the House of Representatives. Yvette registered as a candidate under Bagumbayan-VNP (supported by PDP-Laban and Alfredo Lim's KKK Party) and prior to her candidacy had been appointed by President Rodrigo Roa Duterte as chair of the Nayong Pilipino Foundation.

Ocampo's archrival, ex-Cong. Bienvenido "Benny" Abante, is also running under Asenso Manileño.

Marikina

1st District
Incumbent Representative Bayani Fernando is running for reelection unopposed. Vice Mayor Jose Fabian Cadiz remained on the ballot despite withdrawing.

2nd District
Incumbent Representative Miro Quimbo is term-limited.

Muntinlupa
Incumbent Representative Ruffy Biazon is running for reelection.

Navotas
Incumbent Representative Toby Tiangco is term-limited and is running for Mayor. His brother, incumbent Mayor John Reynald Tiangco is his party's nominee.

Parañaque

1st District
Incumbent Representative Eric Olivarez is running for reelection.

2nd District
Incumbent Representative Gustavo Tambunting is running for reelection, but eventually withdrew. His wife, Joy Tambunting substituted him.

Pasay
Incumbent Representative Imelda Calixto-Rubiano is term-limited and is running for Mayor. Her brother, incumbent Mayor Antonino Calixto is her party's nominee.

Pasig
Incumbent Representative Ricky Eusebio is running for reelection. His opponent is former Congressman Roman Romulo.

Quezon City

1st District
Incumbent Representative Vincent Crisologo is running for Mayor. His son, incumbent councilor Onyx Crisologo is the party's nominee. His opponent is councilor Elizabeth Delarmente.

2nd District
Incumbent Representative Winston Castelo is term-limited and is running for councilor. His wife, Precious Hipolito-Castelo will run for congresswoman. Her opponents are former representatives Annie Susano, Dante Liban and Winsell Beltran-Codora, daughter of Barangay Silangan captain Crisell Beltran.

3rd District
Incumbent Representative Jorge Banal is term-limited.

4th District
Incumbent Representative Feliciano Belmonte Jr. is term-limited and he is set to retire from politics after 27 years. His nominee, former Councilor Bong Suntay will run for that position.

5th District
Incumbent Representative Alfred Vargas is running for re-election.

6th District
Incumbent Representative Kit Belmonte is running for re-election.

San Juan
Incumbent Representative Ronaldo Zamora is running for reelection. His opponent is actor Edu Manzano.

Taguig and Pateros

1st District of Taguig and Pateros
Incumbent Congressman Arnel Cerafica is term-limited and is running for Mayor. His brother, Allan Cerafica, will compete for the position against former Foreign Affairs Secretary Alan Peter Cayetano.

2nd District of Taguig
Incumbent Congresswoman Pia Cayetano has opted to run for senator. Competing in her place is her sister-in-law and term limited incumbent Mayor Lani Cayetano, who will be facing former Councilor Michelle Anne Gonzales.

Valenzuela

1st District
Incumbent representative is Weslie Gatchalian.

2nd District
Incumbent representative is Eric Martinez.

References

2019 Philippine general election
Lower house elections in Metro Manila
May 2019 events in the Philippines